"Waiting for You" is a song by Seal. It was released as the final single from his fourth studio album Seal IV.

Formats and track listings
 US maxi CD-single
"Waiting for You" (Burnin' Thick D. vocal remix) – 7:42
"Waiting for You" (The Passengerz remix) – 7:09
"Waiting for You" (BHQ vocal remix) – 7:22
"Waiting for You" (Machine Head remix) – 5:29
"Waiting for You" (29 Palms remix) – 8:15

 International CD-single
"Waiting for You" (album version) – 3:44
"Loneliest Star" (album version) – 4:04

 UK 12" promo
"Waiting for You" (Thick D. vocal mix) – 7:45
"Waiting for You" (Machine Head remix) – 5:59
"Waiting for You" (29 Palms remix) – 8:18

 UK 2x12"
A1 "Waiting for You" (Burnin' Thick D. vocal remix) – 7:45  	
A2 "Waiting for You" (Machine Head remix) – 5:29 	
B1 "Waiting for You" (The Passengerz remix) – 7:11 	
B2 "Waiting for You" (BHQ vocal remix) – 7:24 	
C1 "Waiting for You" (Burnin' Thick D. dub) – 7:31 	
C2 "Waiting for You" (The Passengerz dub) – 6:56 	
D1 "Waiting for You" (29 Palms remix) – 7:00 	
D2 "Waiting for You" (BHQ dub) – 7:30

 UK CD-single
"Waiting for You" – 3:39
"Love's Divine" – 4:35

Charts

See also
 List of number-one dance singles of 2003 (U.S.)

References

2003 singles
Seal (musician) songs
Songs written by Seal (musician)
Songs written by Mark Batson
Song recordings produced by Trevor Horn
Song recordings produced by Mark Batson
2003 songs
ZTT Records singles
Sire Records singles